is side scrolling action-adventure role-playing video game developed and published by Sega for the Master System in 1988. The game is based in a medieval fantasy setting. It is similar to Wonder Boy in Monster Land also released by Sega in 1987 for Arcade.

Plot
The Demon Lord Ra Goan once again spreads terror on Baljinya as he had done a thousand years ago. But now the kingdom's king has been killed by Ra Goan, putting the kingdom in disarray as there is no one next in line for the throne. A council of elders have decided that the rightful one to take over the throne will have to pass three tests. Landau embarks on the quest to save his beloved land and starts to find the wizard in Amon.

Gameplay
Landau is armed with a sword for close combat, and a bow for ranged combat. The Kingdom of Baljinya has towns and villages where Landau can stop to rest (restoring his health) and gather information from the people. There are also castles which can only be entered after completing certain tasks. Each time the player has the opportunity to speak with a character, he should talk with the character several times in succession in order to get all possible messages. If he does not get all possible messages, bosses and secret paths in the game will not appear. If something does not appear for the player, he will most likely need to speak with a character, or speak with a character additional times. There are different kinds of terrains between those villages, towns and castles. Flat lands, dark forests, mountains and swamps make up the rest of the landscape.

Those terrains are plagued by different kinds of monsters, some specific of each terrain. If killed, the player has up to ten continues to complete the quests. The game features no battery backup or password based save feature. When faced with a boss monster, the player will need to hit its weak point or at its weak moment. Often when a boss monster is destroyed, Landau is rewarded with a better sword or better bow which deals more damage.

Reception

Lord of the Sword received mixed reviews from critics. Computer and Video Games gave it a 64% score. AllGame gave it an overall rating of 2 stars out of a possible 5.

References

External links

1988 video games
Action-adventure games
Fantasy video games
Master System games
Master System-only games
Metroidvania games
Video games developed in Japan